Tina Križan and Katarina Srebotnik won in the final 7–6, 6–1 against Karin Kschwendt and Evgenia Kulikovskaya.

Seeds
Champion seeds are indicated in bold text while text in italics indicates the round in which those seeds were eliminated.

 Kristie Boogert /  Mirjana Lučić (quarterfinals)
 Lenka Němečková /  Helena Vildová (first round)
 Olga Lugina /  Elena Wagner (first round)
 Radka Bobková /  Eva Melicharová (quarterfinals)

Draw

External links
 1998 Makarska International Championships Doubles Draw

Makarska International Championships
1998 WTA Tour